Orba may refer to:
Orba, Alicante, a town in eastern Spain
Orba (river), a torrential stream in northern Italy
Orba (Irish mythology), a High King of Ireland
Orba (satellite), also known as X-2, was intended to be the first satellite launched by a British rocket
The New Order regime of Indonesia, commonly known as Orba
Orba (instrument), an electronic musical instrument